Cynic or Cynicism may refer to:

Modes of thought
 Cynicism (philosophy), a school of ancient Greek philosophy
 Cynicism (contemporary), modern use of the word for distrust of others' motives

Books
 The Cynic, James Gordon Stuart Grant 1875
 The Cynic: The Political Education of Mitch McConnell

Music
 Cynic (band), a progressive rock/technical death metal band from Miami, Florida
 The Cynics, a rock band from Pittsburgh, Pennsylvania
 Armchair Cynics, a Canadian rock band
 Cynic Guru, a progressive rock band
 The Cynic Project, a trance music project

Albums
 The Cynic (Zoe Rahman album)
 The Cynic, album by Monte Cazazza

Songs
 "The Cynic", single by Kashmir featuring David Bowie, from their album No Balance Palace

Other 
 Cynic epistles, an assorted collection of Roman era letters concerning Cynic philosophy
 Cynical realism, a contemporary movement in Chinese art
 Cynics (film), a 1991 Soviet film
 The Vermont Cynic, a student newspaper of the University of Vermont